Lu Wen-teh (born 26 February 1963) is a Taiwanese professional golfer.

Lu turned professional in 1992 and plays on the Asian Tour where he has five wins.

Professional wins (9)

Asian Tour wins (5)

*Note: The 2007 Macau Open was shortened to 54 holes due to rain.

Asian Tour playoff record (3–1)

Other wins (4)
1990 Thailand Open
1994 Mercuries Masters
1996 Mercuries Masters
2008 Kunming Championship (China)

Team appearances
Amateur
Eisenhower Trophy (representing Taiwan): 1988

Professional
Dunhill Cup (representing Taiwan): 1995
World Cup (representing Taiwan): 2008

See also
List of golfers with most Asian Tour wins

External links

Taiwanese male golfers
Asian Tour golfers
Sportspeople from Taipei
1963 births
Living people